Mashriqi Arabic, or Mashriqi ʿAmmiya, encompasses the varieties of Arabic spoken in the Mashriq, including the countries of Egypt, Lebanon, Palestine, Kuwait, Jordan, Syria, Cyprus, Turkey, Iraq, Sudan, Saudi Arabia, UAE, Oman, Bahrain and Qatar.  The variety is sometimes referred to as Eastern Arabic, as opposed to Western Arabic (Maghrebi Arabic or Darija) and includes Mesopotamian Arabic and Peninsular Arabic, along with Egyptian Arabic, Sudanese Arabic, and Levantine Arabic. Speakers of Mashriqi call their language ʿAmmiya, which means "language of the majority" in Modern Standard Arabic.

Modern Standard Arabic ( al-fuṣḥá) is the primary language used in the government, legislation, and judiciary of countries in the Mashriq region. Mashriqi Arabic is used for almost all spoken communication, as well as in television and advertising in Egypt and Lebanon, but Modern Standard Arabic is used in written communication. In Lebanon, where Mashriqi Arabic was taught as a colloquial language as a separate subject under French colonization, some formal textbooks exist.

The varieties of Mashriqi have a significant degree of mutual intelligibility, especially between geographically adjacent ones (such as Lebanese and Syrian or between Iraqi and Kuwaiti). On the contrary, Darija is very hard to understand for Arabic-speakers from the Mashriq, as it derives from different substrata.

It is widely spoken in countries west of Iran and east of Saudi Arabia, such as in Iraq and Kuwait. It somewhat differs from Peninsular Arabic and Egyptian Arabic.

Varieties 
Varieties of Arabic
Koinés:
Mesopotamian Arabic
Hijazi Arabic
Egyptian Arabic
Nejdi Arabic
Yemeni Arabic
Levantine Arabic
Palestinian Arabic
Jordanian Arabic
Syrian Arabic
Lebanese Arabic
Israeli Arabic
Bedouin
Bedawi Arabic

References

Further reading
Singer, Hans-Rudolf (1980) “Das Westarabische oder Maghribinische” in Wolfdietrich Fischer and Otto Jastrow (eds.) Handbuch der arabischen Dialekte. Otto Harrassowitz: Wiesbaden. 249–76.

 
Arabic languages
Languages of Israel